The Amalgamated Union of Asphalt Workers (AUAW) was a trade union representing workers in the asphalt industry in the United Kingdom.

The union was founded in 1938 with the merger of the National Asphalt Workers' Union and the Northern Asphalt Workers' Union.  Although its membership was always small, it covered the entirety of Great Britain and workers involved in all aspects of asphalt, from manufacture to construction workers.

In 1980, the union had 2,680 members.  In 1988, it merged into the Transport and General Workers' Union.

General Secretaries
1938: F. V. Jenkin
1950s: Herbert Softley
1960s: Harry M. Wareham
1986: Derek McCann

Assistant General Secretaries
1960s: Tony (Antonio) Avella
1970s: Derek McCann

References

Defunct trade unions of the United Kingdom
1938 establishments in the United Kingdom
Building and construction trade unions
Manufacturing trade unions
Trade unions established in 1938
Trade unions disestablished in 1987
Transport and General Workers' Union amalgamations
Trade unions based in London